Cetylpyridinium chloride (CPC) is a cationic quaternary ammonium compound used in some types of mouthwashes, toothpastes, lozenges, throat sprays, breath sprays, and nasal sprays. It is an antiseptic that kills bacteria and other microorganisms. It has been shown to be effective in preventing dental plaque and reducing gingivitis. It has also been used as an ingredient in certain pesticides. 
Though one study seems to indicate cetylpyridinium chloride does not cause brown tooth stains, at least one mouthwash containing CPC as an active ingredient bears the warning label "In some cases, antimicrobial rinses may cause surface staining to teeth," following a failed class-action lawsuit brought by customers whose teeth were stained.

The name breaks down as:

 cetyl- means cetyl group, which derives from cetyl alcohol that was first isolated from the whale oil;
pyridinium refers to the cation [C5H5NH]+, the conjugate acid of pyridine;
 chloride refers to the anion Cl−.

Medical use 
OTC (Over The Counter) products containing cetylpyridinium chloride include oral wash, oral rinse, and ingestable products, such as lozenges and over-the-counter cough syrup.

The United States' federal Food and Drug Administration's monograph on oral antiseptic drug products reviewed the data regarding CPC and made this conclusion:

The National Library of Medicine Toxicology Data Network (TOXNET) reviewed the range of toxicity of CPC and stated "Significant toxicity is rare after exposure to low concentration products that are typically available in the home."

The fatal dose in humans ingesting cationic detergents has been estimated to be 1 to 3 g. Therefore, a person using a typical oral ingestible product that provides 0.25 mg CPC per dose would need to take 4,000 doses at one time to reach the estimated fatal dose range.

A review found that mouthwashes containing CPC "provide a small but significant additional benefit when compared with toothbrushing only or toothbrushing followed by a placebo rinse" in reducing plaque and gingivitis-inflammation. In combination with chlorhexidine and zinc lactate, CPC has been found to be effective in treating halitosis. 

CPC mouthwashes inactivate viruses, including Covid viruses, by breaking their lipid envelope.

Side effects

Tooth staining
Cetylpyridinium chloride is known to cause tooth staining in approximately 3 percent of users. The Crest brand has noted that this staining is actually an indication that the product is working as intended, as the stains are a result of bacteria dying on the teeth. Crest stated that because of the low incidence of staining, there was no need to label Pro-Health mouthwash as a potential tooth stainer. However, after numerous complaints and a federal class-action lawsuit, which was later dismissed, the mouthwash now contains a label warning consumers of its potential to stain teeth.

Temporary loss of taste

In a small percentage of population, CPC can alter or eliminate the sense of taste.  The effect generally goes away a few days after discontinuing use of the product.

Toxicology and pharmacology
The  of cetylpyridinium chloride has been measured at 30 mg/kg in rats and 36 mg/kg in rabbits when the chemical is administered by intravenous infusion but 200 mg/kg in rats, 400 mg/kg in rabbits, and 108 mg/kg in mice when administered orally.

Chemistry
The molecular formula of cetylpyridinium chloride is C21H38NCl. In its pure form it is a solid at room temperature. It has a melting point of 77 °C when anhydrous or 80–83 °C as a monohydrate . It is soluble in water but insoluble in acetone, acetic acid, or ethanol. It has a pyridine-like odor. It is combustible. Concentrated solutions are destructive to mucous membranes. Its critical micelle concentration (CMC) is ~ 0.0009–0.0011M, and is strongly dependent on the salt concentration of the solution.

Some products are formulated instead with the bromide salt cetylpyridinium bromide, the properties of which are virtually identical.

Compendial status 
 Food Chemicals Codex
 United States Pharmacopeia 31
 British Pharmacopoeia 1998

See also 
 Mouthwash
 Oral-B
 Chlorhexidine
 Triclosan

References

External links
 Material Safety Data Sheet
 Chemical Information
 

Antiseptics
Preservatives
Chlorides
Pyridinium compounds
Cationic surfactants